The Arrondissement of Aalst is one of the six administrative arrondissements in the Province of East Flanders, Belgium. It forms the Judicial Arrondissement of Dendermonde together with the Arrondissements of Dendermonde and Sint-Niklaas.

History
The Arrondissement of Aalst was created in 1818 by the merging of the canton of Aalst from the Arrondissement of Dendermonde with the cantons of Geraardsbergen, Herzele, Ninove and Zottegem from the Arrondissement of Oudenaarde. When the language border was determined in 1963, part of the then municipality of Twee Akren, in the Arrondissement of Soignies, was added to the arrondissement.

In 1977, the then-municipality of Sint-Maria-Oudenhove ceased to exist when merged with the municipalities of Zottegem and Brakel. As a result, the part of Sint-Maria-Oudenhove which was merged with Brakel was ceded to the Arrondissement of Oudenaarde.

Municipalities
The Administrative Arrondissement of Aalst consists of the following municipalities:
 Aalst
 Denderleeuw
 Erpe-Mere
 Geraardsbergen
 Haaltert
 Herzele
 Lede
 Ninove
 Sint-Lievens-Houtem
 Zottegem

References 

Aalst